Ferula melitensis, the Maltese giant fennel, is a plant species in the family Apiaceae.

References 

melitensis
Flora of Malta